Limnaecia pamphaea is a moth in the family Cosmopterigidae. It is found in Uganda.

References

Natural History Museum Lepidoptera generic names catalog

Limnaecia
Moths described in 1965
Moths of Africa